is a Japanese singer, actor, and member of the idol group Shonentai. He is married to actress Yoshino Kimura.

Filmography

Film
 Love Forever (1983)
 Aitsu to Lullaby (1983) – Hiroshi Machida
 Nineteen  (1987) – East
 Maji! (1991) – Motoki Shirogane
 Tengoku no Taizai (1992) – Detective Aoki
 Makoto (2005) – Makoto Shirakawa
 Yamazakura (2008) – Yaichirō Tezuka
 Ogawa no Hotori (2011) – Sakunosuke Inui
 Genji Monogatari: Sennen no Nazo (2011) – Fujiwara no Michinaga
 Eight Ranger (2012) – Terrorist group leader
 Trick The Movie: Last Stage (2014) – Shinichi Kagami
 Eight Ranger 2 (2014) – Terrorist group leader
 Laughing Under the Clouds (2018) – Iwakura Tomomi
 Perfect Strangers (2021)

Television
 Great Magistrate: Tōyama no Kin-san (1988–1992) – Mizuki Shingo
 The Tale of Genji, Volume 1 (1991) – Hikaru Genji
 Ryūkyū no Kaze (1993) – Keitai
 Genroku Ryōran (1999) – Asano Naganori
 Morimura Seiichi no Munesue Keiji (2005–2019) – Kōichirō Munesue
 Kuitan (2006–2007) – Seiya Takano
 Hissatsu Shigotonin (2007–2019) – Kogoro Watanabe
 The Partner (2013) – Sakitarō Asaba
 Ōoka Echizen (2013–2019) – Ōoka Tadasuke aka Ōoka Echizen
 Keiji 7-Nin (2015–present) – Yū Amagi
 Hana Moyu (2015) – Kido Takayoshi
 Yokokuhan: The Pain (2015) – Eiji Sakuma
 Nobunaga Moyu (2016) – Oda Nobunaga

Dubbing

Live-action
 We Bought a Zoo – Benjamin Mee (Matt Damon)

Animation
 Brother Bear – Kenai

Stage

References

1966 births
Living people
People from Kawasaki, Kanagawa
Japanese male pop singers
Taiga drama lead actors
Japanese male child actors
Japanese male film actors
Japanese male stage actors
Japanese male television actors
Male actors from Kanagawa Prefecture
Musicians from Kanagawa Prefecture
20th-century Japanese male actors
21st-century Japanese male singers
21st-century Japanese singers
21st-century Japanese male actors